Upcycling, also known as creative reuse, is the process of transforming by-products, waste materials, useless, or unwanted products into new materials or products perceived to be of greater quality, such as artistic value or environmental value.

Description
Upcycling is the opposite of downcycling, which is the other part of the recycling process. Downcycling involves converting materials and products into new materials, sometimes of lesser quality. Most recycling involves converting or extracting useful materials from a product and creating a different product or material.

The terms upcycling and downcycling were first used in print in an article in SalvoNEWS by Thornton Kay quoting Reiner Pilz and published in 1994.

Upsizing was the title of the German edition of a book about upcycling first published in English in 1998 by Gunter Pauli and given the revised title of Upcycling in 1999. The German edition was adapted to the German language and culture by Johannes F. Hartkemeyer, then Director of the Volkshochschule in Osnabrück. The concept was later incorporated by William McDonough and Michael Braungart in their 2002 book Cradle to Cradle: Remaking the Way We Make Things. They state that the goal of upcycling is to prevent wasting potentially useful materials by making use of existing ones. This reduces the consumption of new raw materials when creating new products. Reducing the use of new raw materials can result in a reduction of energy usage, air pollution, water pollution and even greenhouse gas emissions.

This is a significant step towards regenerative design culture where the end products are cleaner, healthier, and usually have a better value than the material inputs. For example, during the recycling process of plastics other than those used to create bottles, many different types of plastics are mixed, resulting in a hybrid. This hybrid is used in the manufacturing of plastic lumber applications.  However, unlike the engineered polymer ABS which hold properties of several plastics well, recycled plastics suffer phase-separation that causes structural weakness in the final product.

In 2009, Belinda Smith from Reuters wrote that upcycling had increased in the rich countries but observed that upcycling was a necessity in poorer ones: Supporters of the environmentally friendly practice of upcycling say people in developing countries have effectively been upcycling for years, using old packaging and clothing in new ways, although more out of need than for the environment. But upcycling is now taking off in other countries, reflecting an increased interest in eco-friendly products, particularly ones that are priced at an affordable level and proving profitable for the manufacturers. "If upcycling is going to become mainstream, then the corporate world needs to see that it can be profitable," said Albe Zakes, spokesman of U.S. company TerraCycle which specializes in finding new uses for discarded packaging. A growing number of companies are focusing on upcycling although the trend is still in its infancy with industry-wide figures yet to be produced.

Upcycling has shown significant growth across the United States and the World. For example, the number of products on Etsy, Pinterest or Upcycle Studio tagged with the word "upcycled" increased from about 7,900 in January 2010 to nearly 30,000 a year later . , that number stood at 263,685 

Material downcycling occurs when it is either not possible or uneconomic to restore materials to their original quality, for example, when wrought aluminium alloys are melted to produce lower-grade casting alloys. Material upcycling, in the thermodynamic sense, is only possible if even more energy is added to upgrade the material quality. Two guiding questions to ask when assessing recovering for waste materials or products are: How much energy is required to restore the recovered material back to the desired material or product?, and, How does this quantity compare with obtaining the desired material or product from virgin or primary sources? In some cases, little energy is required to reuse a discarded product, for example, secondhand clothing. In other cases, the energy required to recover the materials is more than the energy required to process virgin material.

Applications

Art 

Upcycle Art or sometimes known as Recycled Art or Recycl’Art is the transformation of waste or used materials and objects into art pieces.

While recycle usually means the materials are remade into their originally form e.g. recycle plastic bottles into plastic polymers which then produce plastic bottles through manufacturing process, upcycle adds more value to the materials as the name suggested. According to Watson & Wolfe "Upcycling, also known as creative reuse, is the process of transforming by-products, waste materials, useless, or unwanted products into new materials or products perceived to be of greater quality, such as artistic value or environmental value."
 
Similarly recycle art may refer to art pieces using used materials in their original form while upcycle art may involve transformation process such as breaking down, reforming, reassemble and the likes.

The tradition of reusing found objects (objet trouvé) in mainstream art came of age sporadically through the 20th century, although it has long been a means of production in folk art.  The Amish quilt, for example, came about through reapplication of salvaged fabric. Simon Rodia's Watts Towers (1921–1954) in Los Angeles exemplifies upcycling of scrap metal, pottery and broken glass on a grand scale; it consists of 17 structures, the tallest reaching over 30 meters into the Watts skyline.

Intellectually, upcycling bears some resemblance to the ready-made art of Marcel Duchamp and the Dadaists.  Duchamp's "Bicycle Wheel" (1913), a front wheel and fork attached to a common stool, is among the earliest of these works, while "Fountain" (1917), a common urinal purchased at a hardware store, is arguably his best-known work.  Pablo Picasso's "Bull's Head" (1942), a sculpture made from a discarded bicycle saddle and handlebars, is the Spanish painter's sly nod to the Dadaists. Throughout the mid-century, the artist Joseph Cornell fabricated collages and boxed assemblage works from old books, found objects and ephemera. Robert Rauschenberg collected trash and disused objects, first in Morocco and later on the streets of New York, to incorporate into his art works.

The idea of consciously raising the inherent value of recycled objects as a political statement, however, rather than presenting recycled objects as a reflection or outcome from the means of production, is largely a late 20th-century concept. Romuald Hazoumé, an artist from the West African Bénin, was heralded in 2007 for his use of discarded plastic gasoline and fuel canisters to resemble traditional African masks at Documenta 12 in Kassel, Germany.  Hazoumé has said of these works, "I send back to the West that which belongs to them, that is to say, the refuse of consumer society that invades us every day." Jeff Wassmann, an American artist who has lived in Australia for the past 25 years, uses items found on beaches and junk stores in his travels to create the early Modern works of a fictional German relative, Johann Dieter Wassmann (1841–1898).  In Vorwarts (Go Forward) (pictured), Wassmann uses four simple objects to depict a vision of modern man on the precarious eave of the 20th century: an early optometry chart as background, a clock spring as eye, a 19th-century Chinese bone opium spoon from the Australian gold fields as nose and an upper set of dentures found on an Australian beach as mouth.  Wassmann is unusual among artists in that he does not sell his work, rather they are presented as gifts; by not allowing these works to re-enter the consumer cycle, he averts the commodification of his end product.

Max Zorn is a Dutch tape artist who creates artwork from ordinary brown packaging tape and hangs pieces on street lamps as a new form of street art at night. By adding and subtracting layers of tape on acrylic glass with a surgical scalpel, the artwork can only be visible when light is placed behind it, mimicking the effects similar to stained glass window methods. His technique with pioneering upcycling with street art has been featured at Frei-Cycle 2013, the first design fair for recycling and upcycling in Freiburg, Germany.

Music 
A prominent example is the Recycled Orchestra of Cateura in Paraguay. The instruments of the orchestra are made from materials taken from the landfill of Asunción, whose name comes from the Cateura lagoon in the area. A limited part of its real history is narrated in the film Landfill Harmonic.

Industry 
Many industrial processes, like plastic, paint, and electronic fabrication, rely on the consumption of finite resources. Furthermore, the waste may have an environmental impact and can affect human health. Within this context, upcycling describes the use of available and future technologies to reduce waste and resource consumption by creating a product with a higher value from waste or byproduct streams.

In consumer electronics, the process of re-manufacturing or refurbishment of second-hand products can be seen as upcycling because of the reduced energy and material consumption in contrast to new manufacturing. The re-manufactured product has a higher value than disposing or downcycling it. The use of Brewer's spent grain, a waste product of brewing processes, as a substrate in biogas processes eliminates the need for disposal and can generate significant profit to the overall brewing process. Depending on the substrate's price, a profit of approximately 20% of the operational costs is possible. In this process, the biogas plant acts as an "upcycler".

Clothes 

Designers have begun to use both industrial textile waste and existing clothing like as the base material for creating new fashions. Upcycling has been known to use either pre-consumer or post-consumer waste or possibly a combination of the two. Pre-consumer waste is made while in the factory, such as fabric remnants left over from cutting out patterns. Post-consumer waste refers to the finished product when it’s no longer useful to the owner, such as donated clothes. Textile upcycling has an official certification process called UPMADE®. Fashion designers such as Ksenia Schnaider and Reet Aus have applied upcycling philosophy by designing entire collections from scraps.

Often, people practice linear economy where they are content to buy, use, then throw away. This system contributes to millions of kilos of textile waste being thrown away. While most textiles produced are recyclable, around 85% end-up in landfills in the USA alone. To live a sustainable life, clothing options opposite to the "throw away" attitude encouraged by fast fashion are needed. Upcycling can help with this, as it puts into practice a more circular economy model. A Circular Economy is where resources are used for as long as possible, getting the most value out of them while in use, then restored and repurposed when their use is over. Popularized by McDonough and Braungart, this has also been known as the cradle-to-cradle principle. This principle states a product should be designed either to have multiple life cycles or be biodegradable.

Food 
Billions of pounds of food are wasted every year around the world, but there are ways that people reuse food and find a way to upcycle. One common method is to feed it to animals because many animals, such as pigs, will eat all the scraps given. Food waste can be donated and restaurants can save all the food customers don't eat. Donations can also be made by contacting local agricultural extension offices to find out where to donate food waste and how often and how much one can donate.

Another form of upcycling food is to break it down and use it as energy. Engineers have found a way to break the food down into a reusable bio-fuel by pressure cooking it and then they are able to make methane out of the remains which can be used to produce electricity and heat. When the food isn't used in those ways, another way is to just break it down and use it in compost, which will improve the soil. Many types of food waste, such as fruits, vegetables, egg shells, nuts, and nut shells, can be used in compost to enrich soil. A 2019-founded non-profit, The Upcycled Food Association, established certification standards and a logo that allows consumers to be confident of the upcycled food being consumed. Whole Foods named upcycling one of the ten food trends of 2021.

Design processes 
Tonnes of wastes are produced every day in our cities, and some educators are attempting to raise citizens' awareness, especially the youth. To redefine the concept of recycling previously confined to trash categorization, groups of young designers have attempted to transform "trash" into potentially marketable products such as backpacks made of waste plastic bags and area rugs created by reusing hides. One relevant book published by Community Museum Project in Hong Kong in 2010, was the first experiment on upcycling systems design.  Spanning across material collecting, upcycling design, local production and public dissemination, it provides proposals towards a sustainable system that will cast impact on our strategies of waste handling and energy saving.

Hong Kong local inventor Gary Chan is actively involved in designing and making 'upcycling' bikes by making use of waste materials as parts for his bikes. He invented at least 8 bikes using wastes as a majority of the materials. Gary and his partners at Wheel Thing Makers regularly collect useful wastes such as leather skin from sofas, hardwood plates of wardrobes, or rubber tires from vehicle repair stores in the waste collection station on streets.

Potential technologies 
The worldwide plastic production was 280 million tons in 2011 and production levels are growing every year. Its haphazard disposal causes severe environmental damage, such as the creation of the Great Pacific garbage patch. In 2018, global annual plastic consumption grew to over 320 million tons. In order to solve this problem, the employment of modern technologies and processes to reuse the waste plastic as a cheap substrate is under research. The goal is to bring this material from the waste stream back into the mainstream by developing processes, which will create an economic demand for them.

One approach in the field involves the conversion of waste plastics (like LDPE, PET, and HDPE) into paramagnetic, conducting microspheres  or into carbon nano-materials by applying high temperatures and chemical vapor deposition. On a molecular level, the treatment of polymers like polypropylene or thermoplastics with electron beams (doses around 150 kGy) can increase material properties like bending strength and elasticity and provides an eco-friendly and sustainable way to upcycle them. Active research is being carried out for the biotransformation upcycling of plastic waste (e.g., polyethylene terephthalate and polyurethane) into PHA bioplastic using bacteria. PET could be converted into the biodegradable PHA by using a combination of temperature and microbial treatment. First it gets pyrolized at 450 °C and the resulting terephthalic acid is used as a substrate for microorganisms, which convert it finally into PHA. Similar to the aforementioned approach is the combination of nano-materials like carbon nanotubes with powdered orange peel as a composite material. This might be used to remove synthetic dyes from wastewater.

Biotechnology companies have recently shifted focus towards the conversion of agricultural waste, or biomass, to different chemicals or commodities.  One company in particular, BioTork, has signed an agreement with the State of Hawaii and the USDA to convert the unmarketable papayas in Hawaii into fish feed.  As part of this Zero Waste Initiative put forth by the State of Hawaii, BioTork will upcycle the otherwise wasted biomass into fish feed.

See also 

 Environmentalism
 Food rescue 
 Reuse
 Scrapstore
 Trashion
 Waste hierarchy

References

External links

Culture and the environment
Handicrafts
Recycling
Reuse